Michael Veitch (born 29 November 1962 in Melbourne) is an Australian author, actor and broadcaster, best known for his roles on the sketch comedy television shows The D-Generation, Fast Forward and Full Frontal, as well as for his books on World War II aviation, marine science and travel.

Life and career

Television
Veitch emerged from the University of Melbourne (where he completed an arts degree) sketch comedy and revue tradition. After seeing a performance of a Melbourne University Revue, producers from the Australian Broadcasting Corporation (ABC) in 1985 commissioned The D-Generation, a half-hour weekly sketch comedy series. Its immediate success resulted in a second season in 1987. Veitch performed a wide variety of characters over both seasons of the show which eventually cemented itself among the annals of Australian comedy. Veitch then went on to write and perform in the long-running sketch comedy shows Fast Forward and Full Frontal on the Seven Network between 1989 and 1995.

As one of the lead performers, Veitch became known for his many skillful impersonations and characterisations of current personalities, movie and TV icons such as Sonny (Skippy parody), Clive Robertson and Clive James as well as creating a stable of original characters, particularly Wayne, the colourful airline steward which he created and performed alongside Steve Vizard.

In 2005, Veitch made a short-lived return to sketch comedy in Let Loose Live. Prior to the show's debut, Veitch had said in an interview with the Melbourne Age that "I think that there is a hunger for comedy. We need something to hold the mirror up and look at the familiar in a different way. So much of the world is presented to us as a kind of impervious block of information, and what satire does is say well, actually, no, you don't have to look at everything the way that society wants you to look at it."

From 2006 to 2009, Veitch presented ABC Television's flagship arts magazine program, Sunday Arts; ironically, this was one of the roles which he had performed in parody a decade before on Fast Forward.

In 2012, Veitch starred in the award-winning short film Best Kept Secret, a mockumentary spoof on tourist promotion, filmed in Tasmania and directed by David Pyefinch.

Veitch joined the ensemble cast of the sketch comedy series Open Slather which began airing on Foxtel's The Comedy Channel in May 2015.

Books
Hailing from a family of journalists, Veitch pursued a lifelong interest in the aviation of the Second World War wrote Flak – True stories from the men who flew in World War II published in 2006 by Pan Macmillan and later, Fly: True stories of courage and adventure from the airmen of World War II published by Penguin Australia in August 2008. 
A third book, The Forgotten Islands, exploring the lesser-known islands of Bass Strait, was published by Penguin Australia in August 2011. In 2015, Veitch wrote Southern Surveyor, a book about the CSIRO's Marine National Facility's research vessel.

Also in 2015, Veitch produced a third volume of Second World War airman stories, Heroes of the Skies, published by Penguin Books. In July 2016, he released 44 Days – 75 Squadron and the Fight for Australia through Hachette Australia. This work explores the six-week period in early 1942 when a single squadron of RAAF airmen defended Port Moresby against the ascendant Japanese. His seventh book, detailing the ordeal of an Australian airmen fighting with the French Resistance in 1944, was released by Hachette in late 2017.

Radio 
In 2010, Veitch moved to Hobart, Tasmania, to host afternoons on 936 ABC Hobart local ABC radio. At the beginning of 2012, he began hosting the evening program across Tasmania. Later that year, he left ABC local radio to commence working with a theatre production, with his final broadcast occurring on 20 September 2012.

Theatre
In 2003, Veitch played one of the lead roles in the Australian production of the musical The Full Monty, based on the 1997 film. In 2004, he starred in the musical comedy It's a Dad Thing which toured nationally.

In 2009, Veitch played the lead role of Molly Meldrum in the Melbourne musical comedy Countdown, a tribute to the iconic Countdown TV show of the 1970s and '80s. Veitch was praised for his performance, one reviewer remarking (of the show's return in 2011), "renowned Australian actor Michael Veitch brings the role of Molly Meldrum to life – his portrayal is nothing short of outstanding. One would be forgiven for thinking that Meldrum himself was back on stage. Veitch's imitation skills are flawless and his comic timing is second to none."

In 2014 and 2015, Veitch toured Australia in Flak – True stories from the men who flew in World War Two, a one-man stage version of his aviation books, in which he performs, in character, several of the men whose war stories he uncovered in his books Flak and Fly. This production is ongoing, with more performances due for 2017/18.

Personal life
Veitch has a daughter who edited the student magazine Farrago, and two sons.

Selected television and film roles

The D-Generation (1986–1987)
The D-Generation (Channel 7 Specials) (1988–1989)
Fast Forward (1989–1992)
Bligh (1992)
Full Frontal (1993–1994)
Stark (1993)
Jimeoin (1995)
Halifax f.p. (1995) – 1 episode
Blue Heelers (1996, 2003) – 2 episodes
Mercury (1996)
IMT (1996)
Eric (1997)
Ocean Girl (1997)
Something in the Air (2000) – 3 episodes
Pizza (2000, 2003) – 2 episodes
Shock Jock (2001–2002)
McLeod's Daughters (2002) – 2 episodes
Comedy Inc (2003)
Stingers (2004) – 1 episode
Let Loose Live (2005)
The Extra (2005)
Sunday Arts (2006–2009) (presenter)
Dogstar (2007, 2011) (voice)
City Homicide (2010) – 1 episode
Best Kept Secret (2012) – short film
Open Slather (2015)

Bibliography

, also presented as a one-person play

References

External links

Australian male comedians
Australian military historians
Australian comedy writers
Living people
1962 births
Male actors from Melbourne